The East Ghouta inter-rebel conflict (April–May 2016) was an armed conflict between the rebel coalition of Jaish al-Fustat, consisting of the al-Nusra Front and al-Rahman Legion, and the rebel group Jaysh al-Islam, that occurred in the rebel-held territories east of Damascus. Tensions between the two groups took place since March 2016, when the Rahman Legion expelled Jaysh al-Islam in Zamalka after absorbing the Ajnad al-Sham Islamic Union in February.

Prelude – Clashes in Jisreen
On 18 April 2016, the al-Rahman Legion launched an attack on Jaysh al-Islam headquarters in the town of Jisreen, capturing the headquarters.

Open conflict

Fighting starts
On 28 April, the Rahman Legion and Jaish al-Fustat attacked Jaysh al-Islam positions in six towns in eastern Ghouta, including Qaboun and Zamalka, resulting in the former's air defence brigade defecting to Jaysh al-Islam. Ahrar ash-Sham denied involvement in the conflict and remained neutral. Due to the fighting, the residents of East Ghouta demonstrated, calling for an end of rebel infighting.

Attack on Misraba and ceasefire
On 8 May, Jaish al-Fustat, Jabhat al-Nusra, and al-Rahman Legion attacked the Jaysh al-Islam-held village of Misraba. By this time, Jaysh al-Islam mainly controlled the northern areas of East Ghouta, while Jabhat al-Nusra controlled the south. Jaysh al-Islam also raided several pharmacies, and a doctor was killed by stray bullets. By the next day, a ceasefire agreement was signed which mandated Jaysh al-Islam to withdraw from Misraba, which was then to be controlled by a neutral police force.  Still, despite the declared ceasefire, fighting continued and by 17 May, more than 500 fighters on both sides and a dozen civilians had been killed in the fighting in East Ghouta. A new ceasefire agreement was declared on 24 May 2016.

Aftermath

In mid-June, a new round of fighting left more than 30 fighters dead on both sides.

On 22 July, during a new government offensive in East Ghouta, the Al-Rahman Legion attacked the Jaysh al-Islam-held "Office of Damascus Countryside" in Saqba, resulting in the deaths of nine rebels.

Between 26 April and 1 May 2017, more than 95 rebels were killed during clashes between Jaysh al-Islam, Tahrir al-Sham, and the Rahman Legion. Jaysh al-Islam fighters opened fire on demonstrators who called for an end to the infighting. The clashes led to Syrian Army advances in eastern Damascus.

References

Military operations of the Syrian civil war in 2016
April 2016 events in Syria
May 2016 events in Syria
Military operations of the Syrian civil war involving the al-Nusra Front